Cerne, Totcombe and Modbury Hundred was a hundred in the county of Dorset, England. Some of its tithings and parishes were exclaves which indicates that its ancient manors were likely the possessions of one related family who received them during the reign of William the Conqueror. The hundred contained the following parishes:

Cattistock
Cerne Abbas
Godmanstone
Hilfield
Hawkchurch (part) (transferred to Devon 1896)
Nether Cerne
West Compton

See also
List of hundreds in Dorset

References
Boswell, Edward, 1833: The Civil Division of the County of Dorset (published on CD by Archive CD Books Ltd, 1992)
Hutchins, John, History of Dorset, vols 1-4 (3rd ed 1861–70; reprinted by EP Publishing, Wakefield, 1973)
Mills, A. D., 1977, 1980, 1989: Place Names of Dorset, parts 1–3. English Place Name Society: Survey of English Place Names vols LII, LIII and 59/60

Hundreds of Dorset